Pseudosenegalia is a small genus of flowering plants in the legume family, Fabaceae. It belongs to the subfamily Mimosoideae. It is endemic to Bolivia.

Species list
The genus Pseudosenegalia comprises the following species:
 Pseudosenegalia feddeana (Harms) Seigler & Ebinger (2017)
 Pseudosenegalia riograndensis (Atahuahi & L.Rico) Seigler & Ebinger (2017)

See also
 Acacia
 Acaciella
 Mariosousa
 Parasenegalia
 Senegalia
 Vachellia

References

Mimosoids
Fabaceae genera